Callipterus is a genus of aphids in the family Aphididae.

 Names brought to synonymy
Callipterus elegans Koch, C.l., 1855 and Callipterus platani Kaltenbach, 1843 are synonyms for Tinocallis platani

References

External links 

 
 Callipterus at insectoid.info

Calaphidinae
Sternorrhyncha genera